Dysrhoe is a genus of moths in the family Geometridae first described by Claude Herbulot in 1951.

Species
Dysrhoe olbia Prout, 1911
Dysrhoe rhiogyra Prout, 1932

References

Geometridae genera